Som, SOM or Søm may refer to:

Computing
 System Object Model (file format), of the HP-UX operating system
 Simulation Object Model, in computer high-level architecture (simulation)
 System on module, in computer embedded systems
 Self-organizing map, neural network in machine learning
 IBM System Object Model, a programming tool

Organizations
 SOM Biotech
 SOM Foundation
 SOM Institute
 Skidmore, Owings & Merrill, an American architecture firm
 Yale SOM, the Yale School of Management

Places 
 Som, Somogy, Hungary
 Som, Uttar Pradesh, India
 Søm, Kristiansand, Norway
 Somalia, ISO 3166 three-letter code
 IOC Olympic country code for Somalia
 Somerset, county in England, Chapman code

Transport
 SOM (missile), of the Turkish Air Force
 Som-class submarine, Russia
 Somerset MRT station, Singapore (MRT station abbreviation SOM)
 Somerset Railroad (New York), reporting mark
 SOM Center Road, name of a portion of Ohio State Route 91

Other uses
 Soum (currency) (also spelled "som") unit of currency in some Turkic-speaking countries
 Som (grape), or Furmint
 Somali language, ISO 539 three-letter code
 Som language, of Papua New Guinea
 Serviceable obtainable market, an alternate business term for target market
 Soundman (rank), or SoM, a former rank of the U.S. Navy
 Saskatchewan Order of Merit, Canada, post-nominal letters
 Seine–Oise–Marne culture, an ancient culture in northern France
 Serious otitis media, a disease of the ear
 Soil organic matter

People with the name 
 Preah Botumthera Som (1852–1932), Cambodian writer
 Som Wardner, British musician